Ewa is a district in the Pacific nation of the Republic of Nauru, located in the north of island.

Geography
It covers an area of 1.2 km² and has a population of 300. Ewa is part of the Anetan Constituency.

The northernmost point of Nauru is in the Ewa District.

Buildings and structures
Kayser College - A K-10 school. Named after German missionary Alois Kayser, who lived on the island for forty years.
Capelle & Partner - a department store that is the largest business in Nauru.
An Australian rules football playing ground is to the east of Capelle & Partner; it is a bare patch of crushed coral.
Christ the King Church is located in the town of Arubo.

Education

The primary and secondary schools serving all of Nauru are Yaren Primary School in Yaren District (years 1-3), Nauru Primary School in Meneng District (years 4-6), Nauru College in Denigomodu District (years 7-9), and Nauru Secondary School (years 10-12).

There is a private Catholic school, Kayser College, in Ewa. It serves infant years-year 8; and it served years 1-11 as of April 2002. A new three classroom building opened on 8 May 2015.  the Nauru Department of Education gives the school 80% of its funds.

Notable people
Marcus Stephen, appointed President of Nauru in 2007

See also
 Geography of Nauru
 List of settlements in Nauru

References

External links

Districts of Nauru
Populated places in Nauru